Jay Hart may refer to:

 Jay Hart (footballer) (born 1990), English forward
 Jay Hart (set decorator), American set decorator